Epacrophis boulengeri, also known commonly as the Manda flesh-pink blind snake and the Lamu worm snake, is a species of harmless snake in the family Leptotyphlopidae. The species is endemic to Kenya.

Etymology
The specific name, boulengeri, is in honor of Belgian-British herpetologist George Albert Boulenger.

Geographic range
E. boulengeri is found on Lamu Island and Manda Island.

Habitat

Reproduction
E. boulengeri is oviparous.

References

Further reading
Adalsteinsson SA, Branch WR, Trape S, Vitt LJ, Hedges SB (2009). "Molecular phylogeny, classification, and biogeography of snakes of the family Leptotyphlopidae (Reptilia, Squamata)". Zootaxa 2244: 1-50. (Epacrophis boulengeri, new combination, p. 27).
Boettger O (1913). "Reptilien und Amphibien von Madagascar, den Inseln und dem Festland Ostafrikas ". pp. 269–375 + Plates 23–30. In: Voeltzkow A (1913). "Reise in Ostafrika in den Jahren 1903-1905, mit Mitteln der Hermann und Elise geb. Heckmann Wentzel-Stiftung ausgeführt ". Wissenschaftliche Ergebnisse 3 (4): 269-564 + Plates 23-33. (Glauconia boulengeri, new species, p. 354 + Plate 25, figure 1). (in German).
Loveridge A (1957). "Check List of the Reptiles and Amphibians of East Africa (Uganda; Kenya; Tanganyika; Zanzibar)". Bulletin of the Museum of Comparative Zoology at Harvard College, in Cambridge 117 (2): 153-362 + i-xxxvi (index). (Leptotyphlops boulengeri, new combination, p. 246).

Epacrophis
Reptiles of Kenya
Endemic fauna of Kenya
Reptiles described in 1913
Taxa named by Oskar Boettger